Angelo Marciani (19 April 1928 – 3 December 2022) was an Italian water polo player who competed in the 1956 Summer Olympics. In 1956 he was a member of the Italian team which finished fourth in the Olympic tournament. 

Marciani was born in Camogli on 19 April 1928.
He died in Camogli on 3 December 2022, at the age of 94.

References

1928 births
2022 deaths
Italian male water polo players
Olympic water polo players of Italy
Water polo players at the 1956 Summer Olympics
Sportspeople from the Province of Genoa